The Philippines national basketball team in 2014 led by head coach Chot Reyes first tournament was the 2014 FIBA Asia Cup where they managed to finish third. The team had a series training camps in Miami in the United States, in Antibes, France where they participated in a pocket tournament, and Spain the host country of the FIBA World Cup. They returned to the FIBA World Cup after 36 years last participating in the 1978 edition. The national team did not get past the group stage with only a lone win against Senegal. The win against Senegal was the Philippines first win at the FIBA World Cup since 1974. However the national team did not meet expectations at the Asian Games and failed to reach the medal round. Head Chot Reyes is later replaced by Tab Baldwin who assumed Reyes' former post the next year.

Record

Uniforms

Tournaments

FIBA Asia Cup

Group stage

Quarterfinals

Semifinals

3rd place

Antibes International Basketball Tournament

FIBA World Cup

Group stage

Asian Games

Group stage

Quarterfinals - Group H

Classification round

Exhibition games

References

Philippines men's national basketball team results
2014–15 in Philippine basketball
2013–14 in Philippine basketball